Johannes Jakobs (1 July 1917 – 24 August 1944) was a German footballer who played as a midfielder for Hannover 96 and the Germany national team.

He served in World War II as on Oberfeldwebel in the Luftwaffe. He was killed on a reconnaissance flight on the Eastern Front in Poland and is buried at the Siemanowice war cemetery, Poland.

References

External links
 
 

1917 births
1944 deaths
Association football midfielders
German footballers
Germany international footballers
Hannover 96 players
Military personnel from Cologne
Luftwaffe personnel killed in World War II
Footballers from Cologne